The Woodlands may refer to:

Canada 
The Woodlands School (Mississauga), a junior high and high school in Mississauga, Ontario

England 
 The Woodlands, Leicestershire, a location
 The Woodlands, Holbrook, a location in Suffolk
 The Woodlands, Raydon, a location in Suffolk

United States 
(by state)
The Woodlands (race track), dog and horse racing track in Kansas City, Kansas
The Woodlands (Philadelphia), a National Historic Landmark District in Philadelphia, which includes a mansion and a cemetery 
The Woodlands, Texas
The Woodlands High School, The Woodlands, Texas

See also
Woodland (disambiguation)
Woodlands (disambiguation)
Woodlands School (disambiguation)
Woodlands style (genre of painting)